is a passenger railway station  located in the town of Hino, Tottori Prefecture, Japan. It is operated by the West Japan Railway Company (JR West).

Lines

Station layout
The station consists of one ground-level island platform connected with the station building by a footbridge. The old wooden station building is located on the side of Platform 1, and has a Midori no Madoguchi staffed ticket office.

Platforms

Adjacent stations

History
Neu Station opened on July 30, 1922. With the privatization of the Japan National Railways (JNR) on April 1, 1987, the station came under the aegis of the West Japan Railway Company.

Passenger statistics
In fiscal 2018, the station was used by an average of 436 passengers daily.

Surrounding area
 Hino Town Hall
Tottori Prefectural Hino High School
Hino Municipal Hino Junior High School
Hino Town Neu Elementary School

See also
List of railway stations in Japan

References

External links 

 Neu Station from JR-Odekake.net 

Railway stations in Tottori Prefecture
Stations of West Japan Railway Company
Hakubi Line
Railway stations in Japan opened in 1922
Hino, Tottori